Edward Gifford may refer to:

 Edward Winslow Gifford (1887–1959), ethnographer
Edward Gifford (MP) (c. 1485–1556), MP for Buckingham
Edward Gifford, a character in the film Trial by Combat